The Lost Chords is a live album by American composer, bandleader and keyboardist Carla Bley with Andy Sheppard, Steve Swallow, and Billy Drummond recorded in Europe in 2003 and released on the Watt/ECM label in 2004.

Reception
The album received critical approval. The Allmusic review by Thom Jurek awarded The Lost Chords 3½ stars and stated "The depth of communication here is marvelous, and given the level of comfort these musicians have with one another, that feeling of ease is communicated to the listener as well".  The JazzTimes review by Geoffrey Himes said "if great jazz playing involves fresh harmonic thinking and ensemble give-and-take, this is some of the best jazz playing around.". The Penguin Guide to Jazz awarded it 4 stars calling it "A marvellous record... Recommended to fans and newcomers alike".

Track listing
All compositions by Carla Bley.
 "3 Blind Mice: 3 Blind Mice" - 5:33  
 "3 Blind Mice: Wink Leak/Traps/Leonard Feather" - 5:30  
 "3 Blind Mice: The Maze/Blind Mice Redux" - 4:14  
 "Hip Hop" - 7:44  
 "Tropical Depression" - 7:39  
 "Red" - 6:03  
 "Lost Chords: I" - 9:07  
 "Lost Chords: II" - 4:23  
 "Lost Chords: III" - 3:41

Recorded live in Europe in October 2003.

Personnel
Carla Bley - piano
Andy Sheppard - tenor saxophone  
Steve Swallow - bass guitar  
Billy Drummond - drums

References

ECM Records live albums
Carla Bley live albums
2004 live albums